The Republican People's Union  (French: Union populaire républicaine; Arabic: الاتحاد الشعبي الجمهوري) is a political party in Tunisia.

History 
The party was founded by Lotfi Mraïhi after the Tunisian Revolution.

They won three seats in the Assembly of the Representatives of the People in the 2019 parliamentary election.

References

See also 

 List of political parties in Tunisia

Political parties in Tunisia
2011 establishments in Tunisia
Political parties established in 2011